Sir John Simeon, 3rd Baronet (5 February 1815 on the Isle of Wight – 21 May 1870 in Freiburg) was a British politician and naval officer.

Biography 
Simeon was born on the Isle of Wight in 1815. He was the eldest son of Sir Richard Simeon, 2nd Baronet and his wife Louisa Edith Barrington, the oldest daughter of Sir Fitzwilliam Barrington, 10th Baronet. He received his education at Christ Church, Oxford, from where he graduated with a BA in 1837.

His first marriage was on 26 November 1840 to Jane Maria Baker, daughter of Sir Frederick Francis Baker, 2nd Baronet. Sir John Simeon, 4th Baronet and Sir Edmund Charles Simeon, 5th Baronet were sons from this marriage. His wife died in 1860, and he remarried in the following year to the Honourable Catherine Dorothea Colville, a sister of Charles Colville, 1st Viscount Colville of Culross.

Career 
He initially pursued a naval career before being returned for the Isle of Wight in 1847 as a Liberal Member of Parliament. On 27 March 1848, he became a member of the Canterbury Association and immediately joined the management committee.  The object was to create an Anglican settlement in New Zealand, which happened with the Canterbury region, with Christchurch as its capital. Together with Lord Lyttelton, Lord Richard Cavendish and Edward Gibbon Wakefield, he guaranteed £15,000 to the Canterbury Association in April 1850, which saved it from financial collapse.

In 1851 he converted to Catholicism, and resigned his seat in Parliament through appointment as Steward of the Manor of Northstead on 5 May 1851, "out of a delicate instinct of honour towards those who had elected him while he was a member of the Anglican Church — believing that he had no right to suppose them to be indifferent to the change he had made."

He resigned from the Canterbury Association shortly afterwards on 15 May 1851. He was elected again for the same constituency in 1865, for a time serving as the only Roman Catholic Member of Parliament from an English constituency. 

During the invasion scare of 1859–60 he raised the 2nd (Newport) Isle of Wight Rifle Volunteer Corps and commanded it with the rank of Captain, dated 27 August 1860. Shortly afterwards the 2nd RVC was included in the 1st Administrative Battalion, Isle of Wight Rifle Volunteers, and he was promoted to Major to serve as its second-in-command.

His last political act, on 8 April 1870, was to speak in Parliament against a measure proposed by Charles Newdigate Newdegate for the state inspection of convents, despite being seriously ill at the time. Bursting a blood-vessel in his throat, he set off on a journey to Switzerland to recover his health but died en route while in Freiburg, aged 55.

Legacy 
Simeon Street in Ryde, Isle of Wight, is named after him, as well as the Simeon Arms Public House in the same street. Simeon Quay in Lyttelton, New Zealand is named for the Simeon family. Simeon Street in the Christchurch suburb of Spreydon is named for his brother Charles.

References

External links 
 

1815 births
1870 deaths
Baronets in the Baronetage of the United Kingdom
Liberal Party (UK) MPs for English constituencies
UK MPs 1847–1852
UK MPs 1865–1868
UK MPs 1868–1874
Members of Parliament for the Isle of Wight
Members of the Canterbury Association
John